Megachile leucostomella is a species of bee in the family Megachilidae. It was first formally described by Theodore Dru Alison Cockerell in 1927.

References

Leucostomella
Insects described in 1927